Shaanxi Provincial TV Tower is a free standing concrete telecommunications tower built in 1987 in Xian, China.

See also
List of towers

Towers completed in 1987
Towers in China
Buildings and structures in Shaanxi